M-phase phosphoprotein 8 is an enzyme that in humans is encoded by the MPHOSPH8 gene.

References

Further reading